Fallacia may refer to:
 Fallacia (beetle), a genus of beetles in the family Cerambycidae
 Fallacia (alga), a genus of algae in the family Sellaphoraceae